Live at the Marquee is a live album by Jesus Jones released in 2005 but recorded in 2002 live at London's The Marquee. The album was released as a download only, although a video recording of the performance was released on DVD in 2004.

Track listing
"Zeroes and Ones" - 3:51
"Move Mountains" - 3:03
"International Bright Young Thing" - 2:52
"Caricature" - 3:54
"The Next Big Thing" - 3:49
"The Devil You Know" - 4:29
"In the Face of All This" - 3:23
"Bring It On Down" - 3:56
"All the Answers" - 3:36
"Chemical #1" - 3:05
"Come On Home" - 3:07
"Right Here Right Now" - 3:26
"Are You Satisfied" - 3:52
"Welcome Back Victoria" - 3:36
"Message" - 2:15
"Never Enough" - 2:43
"Rocket Ships" - 3:39
"Half Up the Hill" - 3:29 
"Real Real Real" - 3:06
"Nowhere Slow" - 3:42
"Info Freako" - 2:40
"Who Where Why" - 3:50
"Trust Me" - 2:01
"Cut & Dried" - 3:35
"Idiot Stare" - 5:08
Jesus Jones - Interview - 52:59 (Bonus track)

2005 live albums
Jesus Jones albums
Live albums recorded at The Marquee Club